The 2021 Battery World Aussie Racing Car Series was an Australian motor racing series open to Aussie Racing Cars.

The Championship was cancelled after three rounds and there was no Driver's Champion

Entries

References

External links

Aussie Racing Car
Aussie Racing Cars